Chancellor is a hamlet in southern Alberta, Canada within Wheatland County.

Chancellor originally was built up chiefly by Germans, who named the hamlet after the office of Chancellor of Germany. It got its first post office in 1918 which was lost in a fire in 1930 along with most of the original buildings, with the memorial hall being the only original building standing.

Demographics 

See also 
List of communities in Alberta
List of designated places in Alberta
List of hamlets in Alberta

References 

Hamlets in Alberta
Designated places in Alberta
Wheatland County, Alberta